Nipponasura is a monotypic moth genus in the subfamily Arctiinae. Its single species, Nipponasura sanguinea, is found in Japan. Both the genus and species were first described by Hiroshi Inoue in 1965.

References

Lithosiini